Catherine R. Rodland is an organist and church musician best known for her recitals throughout the United States, Canada, and Europe.  She also holds a teaching position at St. Olaf College.

Rodland graduated from St. Olaf College in 1987, and received M.M. and D.M.A. degrees from the Eastman School of Music, where she was a student of Russell Saunders.  She was a prizewinner in the 1994 and 1998 AGO Young Artists Competitions and the 1994 Calgary International Organ Competition. She was also awarded first prize in the 1989 International Organ Competition at the University of Michigan.

Recordings
Messiaen, Transport du joie from "Ascension", Catherine Rodland, organist
Messiaen, "Dieu parmi mous" from Nativite, Catherine Rodland, organist

References

St. Olaf College Faculty Website 
https://web.archive.org/web/20130103035107/http://www.stolaf.edu/depts/music/faculty/organ.html

American organists
Women organists
American performers of Christian music
Eastman School of Music alumni
Living people
Year of birth missing (living people)
St. Olaf College faculty
St. Olaf College alumni
21st-century American keyboardists
21st-century organists
21st-century American women musicians
American women academics